Watch out, husbands   An Egyptian film produced in 1990 starring Bossi, Saeed Saleh, Hisham Abdel Hamid and Fouad Khalil.

Synopsis 
Actions revolve around Dr. Mahmoud, who prefers his life to his work and forgets his wife, Mona, who is forced to spend most of her time with her friends, and is far from home. Mahmoud is suspicious of his wife's behavior, so he sends Ragab to monitor her, and the actions develop.

Cast 
Bussy as Mona
Saeed Saleh in a welcome role
Hisham Abdel Hamid in the role of
Mahmoud Fouad Khalil as Dr
Mohamed Abdel Moaty as Hussein
Nadia Ezzat as Umm Mahmoud
 Khadija Mahmoud.

References

External links 
 Watch out, husbands on elCinema.

Egyptian comedy films
1990 films